Hillesley and Tresham is a civil parish in the Stroud District of Gloucestershire, England.  It had a population of 591 according to the 2001 census, decreasing to 391 at the 2011 census.  The parish contains the villages of Hillesley and Tresham. The Lyvett (Levett) family, an Anglo-Norman family prominent in Sussex, were lords of the manor of Hillesley in 12th and 13th centuries. The family also held Boxwell, Chipping Sodbury and other places in Gloucestershire.

The parish was formed in 1991 from part of the Hawkesbury parish in the Northavon district of Avon, which was transferred to Stroud District in Gloucestershire at the time.

References 

Civil parishes in Gloucestershire
Stroud District